Deborrea is a genus of moths of the Psychidae family.

Species
 Deborrea cambouei (Oberthür, 1922)
 Deborrea griveaudi Bourgogne, 1982
 Deborrea humberti Bourgogne, 1984
 Deborrea malgassa Heylaerts, 1884
 Deborrea robinsoni Bourgogne, 1964
 Deborrea seyrigi Bourgogne, 1984

References

Psychidae
Psychidae genera